Colleen is a 1927 American comedy film directed by Frank O'Connor and written by Randall Faye. The film stars Madge Bellamy, Charles Morton, J. Farrell MacDonald, Tom Maguire, Sammy Cohen and Marjorie Beebe. The film was released on July 3, 1927, by Fox Film Corporation.

Cast        
Madge Bellamy as Sheila Kelly
Charles Morton as Terry O'Flynn
J. Farrell MacDonald as Mr. O'Flynn
Tom Maguire as Sheridan McShane Kelly
Sammy Cohen as Pawnbroker's Son
Marjorie Beebe as Kitty
Ted McNamara as O'Flynn's Groom
Tom McGuire as Police Lieutenant
Sarah Padden as Police Lieutenant's Wife
Sidney Franklin as Pawnbroker
Carl Stockdale as Bailiff

References

External links
 

1927 films
1920s English-language films
Silent American comedy films
1927 comedy films
Fox Film films
American silent feature films
American black-and-white films
Films directed by Frank O'Connor
1920s American films